"Alright" is a song by American singer Janet Jackson from her fourth studio album, Janet Jackson's Rhythm Nation 1814 (1989). Written by Jackson and Jimmy Jam & Terry Lewis, the song was released on March 4, 1990, by A&M Records as the fourth single from Janet Jackson's Rhythm Nation 1814. In the United Kingdom, it was issued as the album's fifth single in June 1990.

While it was to become the only single of the seven released off the Rhythm Nation 1814 album to not hit the top-two on the US Billboard Hot 100, reaching number four, it became the fourth consecutive single from the album to reach number one on the Dance Club Songs, helping Jackson break a record set by Madonna. "Alright" earned Jackson two 1991 Grammy Award nominations for Best Female R&B Vocal Performance and Best R&B Song.

Composition
"Alright" samples Lyn Collins' 1972 song "Think (About It)" and the song's final hook samples B.T. Express' 1974 song "Do You Like It". The song was recorded again in January 1990 with Heavy D for the music video.

Chart performance
"Alright" peaked at number four on the US Billboard Hot 100, number two on the Hot R&B/Hip-Hop Songs and number one on the Dance Club Songs. It is the only single from the album that did not reach the top two on Billboard Hot 100.

Music video
The music video to the song, which was filmed in February 1990 and was styled to resemble a 1930s and 1950s musical, featured Cyd Charisse, The Nicholas Brothers, and Cab Calloway in one of his last on-screen appearances. Anthony Thomas choreographed the video, with some scenes staged by veteran Hollywood choreographer Michael Kidd. The video begins with Jackson and two male dancers, including Richard Gaines, all wearing flashy zoot suits sitting on a bench. A paperboy throws newspapers on them. They wake up and read the frontpage of the newspaper, from which they learn Calloway is in town for the premiere of his Alright film. Jackson and her dancers take a cross-town journey to the premiere. There, Jackson, her dancers and Calloway fans wait for Calloway to make his grand entrance. Jackson seemingly envisions herself as Calloway's glamorized female guest, getting pushed to the red carpet. Calloway takes her hand and helps her up. Jackson and her dancers get in Calloway's limo. They arrive at large dance out in the middle of a street. Jackson and her dancers climb on the back of a car and Jackson notices her watch is missing. They get off the car and are sprayed by a street cleaning truck. They sit on the bench. Later that night, Jackson and her dancers are homeless people asleep on the bench—revealing the video to have been a dream. Cab Calloway, in the meantime, walks to the bench and places Jackson's watch in her hand. He sneaks away saying, "Alright". There is also an extended version that features rapper Heavy D. Jackson won a Soul Train Music Award for Best R&B/Soul or Rap Music Video in 1991.

During MTV's first-ever MTV Icon in 2001, American singer Usher paid tribute to Jackson by re-enacting the sidewalk bench routine with the two male dancers from the "Alright" music video. In 2011, Chris Brown's video "Yeah 3x" was compared to the video.

Live performances
Jackson has performed the song on all of her tours. In the Rhythm Nation 1814 Tour, janet. Tour, The Velvet Rope Tour and All for You Tour, Jackson performs the song wearing a Zoot suit. On the Rock Witchu Tour, she wears a sailor suit. On the Number Ones: Up Close and Personal tour, she wears a black catsuit. Jackson also included the song on her 2015-2016 Unbreakable World Tour and the 2017-2019 State of the World Tour in a medley with "Miss You Much" and "You Want This". She also included the song on her 2019 Las Vegas Residency Janet Jackson: Metamorphosis. It was also included on her special concert series Janet Jackson: A Special 30th Anniversary Celebration of Rhythm Nation in 2019.

Track listings and formats
US 12-inch single
 "Alright" (12-inch R&B mix) – 7:17
 "Alright" (7-inch R&B mix) – 4:34
 "Alright" (a cappella) – 3:26
 "Alright" (12-inch house mix) – 8:30
 "Alright" (hip house dub) – 6:40
 "Alright" (house dub) – 5:58

UK 12-inch single
 "Alright" (CJ Mackintosh hip hop mix) – 7:24
 "Alright" (CJ Mackintosh house mix) – 9:10

Charts

Weekly charts

Year-end charts

Certifications

|}

Release history

References

1989 songs
1990 singles
A&M Records singles
Janet Jackson songs
Music videos directed by Julien Temple
New jack swing songs
Song recordings produced by Jimmy Jam and Terry Lewis
Songs written by James Brown
Songs written by Janet Jackson
Songs written by Jimmy Jam and Terry Lewis